"Bottomless Pit!" is the 14th episode of the first season of the American animated television series Gravity Falls, created by Alex Hirsch. The episode was written by Alex Hirsch and Mike Rianda, and directed by Joe Pitt and Aaron Springer. The episode features Soos, Grunkle Stan, Dipper Pines, and Mabel Pines falling down a bottomless pit and telling stories to pass the time.

"Bottomless Pit!" premiered on Disney Channel in the United States on March 1, 2013, and garnered 3.45 million viewers on its premiere night.

Plot 
The Mystery Gang, consisting of Grunkle Stan, Dipper Pines, Mabel Pines, and Soos, throw away unwanted trash at the  bottomless pit next to the Mystery Shack. While Dipper doubts the possibility of such a pit, strong winds cause the crew to fall into the pit. While in the pit, the crew try to pass the time by telling stories, with Dipper going first.

Voice Over 
Dipper runs to the Mystery Shack, screaming for help. The Mystery Shack crew, hearing this, makes fun of his high-pitched voice. Dipper walks away, ashamed of his voice. While walking, Old Man McGucket hears him, and brings Dipper to where he lives. McGucket shows Dipper a formula that changes his voice, and Dipper drinks it. The next day, Dipper finds his voice to be much more "manly", to the shock of the crew. Dipper decides to play a prank call on a local citizen. Soos still doesn't like his voice, and Dipper goes away from the Shack. While walking, the victim of the prank call hears Dipper and, with the help of the townsfolk at the local bar, chases Dipper. Dipper runs back to McGucket's place, and regrets taking the formula. Dipper eventually gets a new formula that changes his voice back to normal. Dipper's voice turns back to normal, and dumps the rest into Grunkle Stan's coffee.

Soos' Really Great Pinball Story (Is That A Good Title? Do They Have To Be Puns Or Whatever?) 
Soos tells his story next, about a pinball machine. Soos, with the support of Mabel and Dipper, plans to beat the high score on a pinball machine. Dipper recommends tipping the machine, and the crew join in. Soos gets the high score; however, a cowboy skull inside the machine was able to tell they cheated, and the machine sucks the three into the pinball machine. The machine starts in its most intense mode, and the crew hide. Soos recommends to go to the manual switch-off, and devises a plan to distract the cowboy skull. While Mabel and Dipper distract the skull, Soos rides a minecart to the switch-off button. However, in turning the machine off, the machine would erase all data, including Soos' high score. The skull eventually finds Dipper and Mabel, and reluctantly, Soos pushes the button, and the crew are returned to normal.

Grunkle Stan Wins the Football Bowl 
Grunkle Stan tells a grandiose story about how with his help, his team won the championship. Everyone on the team, a robot, and a trophy girl congratulate him. The rest of the crew thinks the story is boring, to the dismay of Grunkle Stan.

Trooth Ache 
Mabel tells her story last, about Stan's toothache. Stan buys a bear to teach them how to drive, and gets pulled over by the cops. Grunkle Stans tells a lie, and gets away scot-free. Later in the Shack, Mabel tries to confront Stan on lying to the police. Stan defends his lying, to Mabel's dislike. Mabel devises a plan to stop Stan's lying by checking Dipper's journal. Inside it, she finds an entry about teeth that forces people to tell the truth. At night, Mabel enters and replaces Stan's regular dentures with the truth teeth. Immediately, Stan tells the truth. Dipper thinks it's a horrible idea, but Mabel convinces him it's good to always tell the truth. Stan eventually goes haywire on telling the truth about his thoughts, being brutally honest. Mabel and Dipper start to regret the idea, when Stan is eventually questioned by the cops under further investigation. Before Stan can tell the truth, and Mabel reluctantly lies to get Stan away from being arrested. Mabel eventually switches his teeth back to normal.

Reality 
The crew end up going back upwards to reality to the Mystery Shack, with no time having passed. The crew eventually agree to keeping the story secret between themselves. Stan accidentally falls into the pit again.

Production 
The episode was written by show creator Alex Hirsch and Mike Rianda.

Critical reception 
Alasdair Wilkins of The A.V. Club awarded the episode an "A-", praising the episode's trilogy format. Wilkins also praised the relative insanity of the stories.

References 

2013 American television episodes
Gravity Falls episodes